The Return of the Third Tower is the third album by The Howling Hex.  It was released as an LP by Drag City in 2004.

Track listing
All songs by the Howling Hex except where noted.

Side one
"Acoustic Copy"
"Aim at the Crosshairs"
"Deception=Pride"
"Laughter Returns to the Morning Show"
"Polesitting Immigrant Boys"
"Speak Up, I'm Listening"
"Rocklyn Fortunes"
"The Gospel Bird"
"Difference-to-Thirty"
"Lousy Yellow Mutt"
"What You See Is What You Deserve"

Side two
"Wrong Ace"
"De Colores" (Trad. Arr. Howling Hex)
"Doing Fine"
"Pretty"
"Imaginary Saints"
"Juniper Tree"

2004 albums
Howling Hex albums
Drag City (record label) albums